Mandevilla boliviensis is a species of flowering plant in the dogbane family Apocynaceae, native to a region ranging from Costa Rica south to Bolivia and Brazil. Common names include white mandevilla and white dipladenia.

It has big white flowers with a yellow center which grow in clusters. It flowers from spring until the autumn.

It does not tolerate freezing temperatures, though in summer it can be placed outside. It requires a sheltered spot in full sunlight. In cultivation in the United Kingdom, it has gained the Royal Horticultural Society’s Award of Garden Merit.  Hybrid ornamental cultivars have been developed, e.g. ‘Cosmos White’.

References

boliviensis
Flora of Central America
Flora of northern South America
Flora of South America
Flora of Bolivia
Flora of Brazil
Plants described in 1869